The 1987–88 North Texas State Mean Green men's basketball team (often referred to as "North Texas" or the "Mean Green") represented the University of North Texas as a member of the Southland Conference during the 1987–88 college basketball season. The team was led by head coach Jimmy Gales and played their home games at the Super Pit in Denton, Texas. After winning the conference regular season title, the Mean Green followed that success by winning the Southland tournament to receive an automatic bid to the NCAA tournament. Making the school's first appearance in the NCAA Tournament and playing as the No. 15 seed in the West region, the Mean Green were beaten by No. 2 seed North Carolina in the opening round. The team finished with a record of 17–13 (12–2 Southland).

Roster

Schedule and results

|-
!colspan=9 style=| Non-conference Regular season

|-
!colspan=9 style=| Southland Regular season

|-
!colspan=9 style=| Non-conference Regular season

|-
!colspan=9 style=| Southland Regular season

|-
!colspan=9 style=| Southland tournament

|-
!colspan=9 style=| NCAA tournament

References

North Texas Mean Green men's basketball seasons
North Texas
North Texas
North Texas Mean Green men's basketball team
North Texas Mean Green men's basketball team